Vekenega (Zadar - Zadar, September 27, 1111) was a Croatian Benedictine nun from the House of Madi, a noble family from Zadar. She was the daughter of Čika and the abbess of the Benedictine monastery of St. Maria in Zadar from 1072. She is also known for the richly illuminated evangelistary, which she commissioned in the scriptorium of the monastery of st.Krševan in 1096.

Life

She was the daughter of Čika, a member of the noble patrician Madi family, known to have founded the monastery of st. Mary in Zadar. When the king Petar Krešimir IV placed the monastery under the royal protection, he referred to Čika as his sister.

After the tragic death of Vekenega's husband, Dobroslav, Vekenega becomes the nun of the aforementioned monastery in 1072.

References

External links
Vekenega's Gospels - 11th Century
Čika and Vekenega 

Croatian nuns
12th-century Croatian people
12th-century Croatian nobility
1111 deaths
People from Zadar
Year of birth unknown
11th-century Croatian women
11th-century Christian nuns
11th-century Croatian nobility